Father Won't Allow It is a 1921 German silent comedy film directed by Erich Schönfelder.

The film's sets were designed by the art director Robert Neppach.

Cast
In alphabetical order
Anton Edthofer as Toni Biebelhuber
Julius Falkenstein as Graf von und zu Bürstenberg
Hans Junkermann as Baron Geisenbach
Anni Korff as Dora Haller
Lotte Neumann as Hally Geisenbach
Erich Schönfelder as Kunsthändler Haas
Emmy Wyda as Amanda Geisenbach

References

External links

Films of the Weimar Republic
Films directed by Erich Schönfelder
German silent feature films
UFA GmbH films
German black-and-white films
1921 comedy films
German comedy films
Silent comedy films
1920s German films
1920s German-language films